Quercus tomentosinervis is an Asian species of tree in the beech family Fagaceae. It has been found only  in southern China (Guizhou, Yunnan). It is placed in subgenus Cerris, section Cyclobalanopsis.

Quercus tomentosinervis is a tree up to 20 meters tall. Leaves can be as much as 15 cm long, thick and leather, green and hairless on top but covered with brown woolly hairs on the underside.

References

External links
line drawing, Flora of China Illustrations vol. 4, fig. 380, drawings 1-5 at lower right

tomentosinervis
Flora of Guizhou
Flora of Yunnan
Trees of China
Plants described in 1976